This is an audio and video discography of Tristan und Isolde, an opera by Richard Wagner which was first performed on 10 June 1865 in Munich.

Recording history
Tristan und Isolde has a long recorded history. In the years before World War II, Kirsten Flagstad and Lauritz Melchior were considered to be the prime interpreters of the lead roles, and mono recordings exist of this pair in a number of live performances led by conductors such as Thomas Beecham, Fritz Reiner, Artur Bodanzky and Erich Leinsdorf. Flagstad recorded the part commercially only near the end of her career in 1952, under Wilhelm Furtwängler for EMI, producing a set which is considered a classic recording. Following the war, the performances at Bayreuth with Martha Mödl and Ramon Vinay under Herbert von Karajan (1952) were highly regarded, and these performances are now available as a live recording. In the 1960s, the soprano Birgit Nilsson was considered the major Isolde interpreter, and she was often partnered with the Tristan of Wolfgang Windgassen. Their performance at Bayreuth in 1966 under the baton of Karl Böhm was captured by Deutsche Grammophon—a performance often hailed as one of the best Tristan recordings. Some collectors prefer the pairing of Nilsson with the Canadian tenor Jon Vickers, available in "unofficial" recordings from performances in Vienna or Orange.

There are several DVD productions of the opera including Götz Friedrich's production at the Deutsche Oper in Berlin featuring the seasoned Wagnerians René Kollo and Dame Gwyneth Jones in the title roles. Deutsche Grammophon released a DVD of a Metropolitan Opera performance featuring Jane Eaglen and Ben Heppner, conducted by James Levine, in a production staged by Jürgen Rose, and a DVD of the 1995 Bayreuth Festival production with conductor Daniel Barenboim and featuring Waltraud Meier as Isolde and Siegfried Jerusalem as Tristan, staged by Heiner Mueller.

Audio recordings

Video recordings

 Conductor: Pierre Boulez. Soloists: Wolfgang Windgassen; Birgit Nilsson; Hans Hotter; Chorus and Orchestra of the Osaka Festival. Recorded [on black and white film], Osaka, 10 April 1967. Wieland Wagner directed the production.
 Conductor: Karl Böhm. Soloists: Jon Vickers; Birgit Nilsson. New Philharmonia Chorus; ORTF Orchestra. Théâtre Antique, Orange, France, 7 July 1973. This is a highly valued video recording due to its excellent performance despite some technical problems (as of 2005-11-21). DVD: Hardy Classic Video HCD 40009 (2 DVDs) (2003) is a good print
 Conductor: Daniel Barenboim, Orchester der Bayreuther Festspiele, Staged and Directed by: Jean-Pierre Ponnelle, Soloists: René Kollo, Johanna Meier, Matti Salminen, Hermann Becht, Hanna Schwarz, Unitel 1983, Laserdisc Philips 070-509-1
 Conductor: Jiří Kout, Orchestra & Chorus of the Deutsche Oper Berlin, Staged and Directed by: Götz Friedrich, Soloists: René Kollo, Dame Gwyneth Jones, Robert Lloyd, Gerd Feldhoff, Hanna Schwarz. TDK 1993 DVD
 Conductor: Zubin Mehta; Chorus of the Bayerische Staatsoper, Bayerisches Staatsorchester; Stage Director: Peter Konwitschny; Soloists: Jon Frederic West, Waltraud Meier, Kurt Moll, Bernd Weikl, Marjana Lipovšek. Opus Arte DVD 1998.
 Conductor: Peter Schneider. Soloists: Robert Dean Smith, Iréne Theorin, Michelle Breedt, Robert Holl, Jukka Rasilainen; Bayreuth Festival Orchestra & Chorus. Staged and directed by Christoph Marthaler. 3-DVD set: Opus Arte, ASIN: B002QEXC6W 2009.

References
Notes

Sources
 Brown, Jonathan (2000). Tristan und Isolde on record: a comprehensive discography of Wagner's music drama with a critical introduction to the recordings. Westport, Conn.: Greenwood Press. .

External links
 Recordings of Tristan und Isolde, wagnerdisco.net
Jonathan Brown's discography

Opera discographies